A heptagram, septagram, septegram or septogram is a seven-point star drawn with seven straight strokes.

The name heptagram combines a numeral prefix, hepta-, with the Greek suffix -gram. The -gram suffix derives from γραμμῆ (grammē) meaning a line.

Geometry
In general, a heptagram is any self-intersecting heptagon (7-sided polygon).

There are two regular heptagrams, labeled as {7/2} and {7/3}, with the second number representing the vertex interval step from a regular heptagon, {7/1}.

This is the smallest star polygon that can be drawn in two forms, as irreducible fractions. The two heptagrams are sometimes called the heptagram (for {7/2}) and the great heptagram (for {7/3}).

The previous one, the regular hexagram {6/2}, is a compound of two triangles. The smallest star polygon is the {5/2} pentagram.

The next one is the {8/3} octagram and its related {8/2} star figure (a compound of two squares), followed by the regular enneagram, which also has two forms: {9/2} and {9/4}, as well as one compound of three triangles {9/3}.

Uses

Flags and heraldry

 The seven-pointed star is incorporated into the flags of various bands of Cherokee Indians and the badges of Navajo Nation Police (as well as other police).
 The Bennington flag, a historical American Flag, has thirteen seven-pointed stars along with the numerals "76" in the canton.
 The Flag of Jordan contains a seven-pointed star.
 The Flag of Australia employs five heptagrams and one pentagram to depict the Southern Cross constellation and the Commonwealth Star.
 Some old versions of the coat of arms of Georgia (country) including the Georgian Soviet Socialist Republic used the {7/2} heptagram as an element.
 A seven-pointed star is used as the badge in many sheriff's departments and some smaller-community police departments.
A seven-pointed star is used in the otherkin pride flag.

Law enforcement

Religious and occult symbolism

 The heptagram became a traditional symbol for warding off evil in Catholicism.
 The symbol is also used in Kabbalist Judaism.
 In Islam, the heptagram is used to represent the first seven verses in the Quran.
 The heptagram is used in the symbol for Babalon in Aleister Crowley's occult system Thelema.
 The heptagram is known among neopagans as the Elven Star or Fairy Star. It is treated as a sacred symbol in various modern pagan and witchcraft traditions. Blue Star Wicca also uses the symbol, where it is referred to as a septegram. The second heptagram is a symbol of magical power in some pagan spiritualities.
 In alchemy, a seven-sided star can refer to the seven planets which were known to early alchemists, and also, the seven alchemical substances: fire, water, air, earth, sulphur, salt and mercury.
 In Polynesia, the seven-pointed star is used often in imagery, basket making, tattoos, and is considered to be a symbol of Kanaloa, the first Polynesian navigator.
 The seven-sided star is an important symbol of the Cherokee people of southern Appalachia, representing the seven clans of the Cherokee and the sacred number seven.

In popular culture

 The logo of American shoe brand DC Shoes features a 7/3 heptagram in the letter C. 
 The seven-pointed star is used as the logo for the international Danish shipping company A.P. Moller–Maersk Group, sometimes known simply as Maersk.
 In George R. R. Martin's novel series A Song of Ice and Fire and its TV version Game of Thrones, a seven-pointed star serves as the symbol of the Faith of the Seven.
 In the manga series MeruPuri, a magical mirror/ portal is in the shape of a heptagram. The symbol is also seen during spellcasting.
 Finnish rock band HIM used a heptagram on the cover of their eighth studio album Tears on Tape.
 American heavy metal band Darkest Hour used a heptagram on the cover of their eighth studio album Darkest Hour.
 English Singer Damon Albarn uses a heptagram as a symbol in his solo performances.
 The {7/3} heptagram is used by some members of the otherkin subculture as an identifier.
 The American Progressive Rock Metal Band “Tool” uses an ‘open’ seven pointed symbol for their fan group, The Tool Army.  It is ‘open’ to signify an invitation into the collective unconscious.

See also
 Grünbaum–Rigby configuration
 Star polygon
 Stellated polygons
 Two-dimensional regular polytopes
 Major (United States) insignia of seven leaves

References

Bibliography
 Grünbaum, B. and G.C. Shephard; Tilings and Patterns, New York: W. H. Freeman & Co., (1987), .
 Grünbaum, B.; Polyhedra with Hollow Faces, Proc of NATO-ASI Conference on Polytopes ... etc. (Toronto 1993), ed T. Bisztriczky et al., Kluwer Academic (1994) pp. 43–70.
 John H. Conway, Heidi Burgiel, Chaim Goodman-Strass, The Symmetries of Things 2008,  (Chapter 26. pp. 404: Regular star-polytopes Dimension 2)

External links
 
 Approximate construction method

07
7 (number)